The Mayor is the chief executive of Bridgeport, Connecticut who is directly elected for a four-year term. They have the power to issue executive orders, declare emergencies, submit a yearly budget to the city council and makes appointments to city government offices.

As of July 2012, the Mayor of Bridgeport earns an annual salary of $132,459.

List of mayors
{| class="wikitable"
! Name
! In office
! Party
! Notes
! Reference
|-
| Isaac Sherman, Jr.
| 1836-1837
|
|
| 
|-
| Daniel Sterling, Jr.
| 1837-1838 
|
|
| 
|- 
| Alanson Hamlin
| 1838-1839 
|
|
| 
|-
| Charles Foote
| 1839
|
|
|
|-
| Charles Bostwick
| 1840
|
|
| 
|-
| William P. Burrall
| 1841-1842?
|
|
| 
|-
| James C. Loomis
| 1843-1844
|
|
| 
|-
| Henry K. Harral
| 1844-1847 
|
|
| 
|-
| Sherwood Sterling 
| 1847-1849
|
|
| 
|-
| Henry K. Harral 
| 1849-1851
|
|
| 
|-
| John Brooks, Jr. 
| 1851-1852 
|
|
| 
|-
| Henry K. Harral 
| 1852-1853
|
|
| 
|-
| Charles B. Hubbell 
| 1853-1854 
|
|
| 
|-
| John Brooks, Jr.
| 1854-1855
|
|
| 
|-
| Philo Clark Calhoun 
| 1855-1858
||Democratic
|
| 
|-
| Silas C. Booth 
| 1858-1860
|
|
| 
|-
| Daniel H. Sterling 
| 1860-1863
|
|
| 
|-
| Clapp Spooner 
| 1863-1864
||Republican<ref>America's Successful Men of Affairs: An Encyclopedia of Contemporaneous Biography, Vol. 2 (ed. Henry Hall), 1896, p. 742.</ref>
|
| 
|-
| Jarratt Morford 
| 1864-1865
|
|
| 
|-
| Stillman S. Clapp 
| 1865-1866
|
|
| 
|-
| Monson Hawley
| 1866-1868
|
|
| 
|-
| Jarratt Morford 
| 1868-1869
|
|
| 
|-
| Monson Hawley 
| 1869-1870 
| 
|
| 
|-
| Jarratt Morford 
| 1870-1871
|
|
| 
|-
| Epaphras B. Goodsell 
| 1871-1874
||Democratic
|
| 
|-
| Robert Toucey Clarke
| 1874-1875
|
|
| 
|-
| Phineas Taylor (P.T.) Barnum
| 1875-1876 
||Republican
|
| 
|-
| Jarratt Morford 
| 1876-1878 
|
|
| 
|-
| Robert E. De Forest
| 1878-1879
||DemocraticGerald W. McFarland, Mugwumps, Morals, & Politics, 1884-1920 (University of Massachusetts Press, 1975), pp. 66-67.
|
| 
|-
| John L. Wessells
| 1879-1880
|
|
| 
|-
| Daniel Nash Morgan 
| 1880-1881
||Democratic
|
| 
|-
| John L. Wessells
| 1881-1882
|
|
| 
|-
| Carlos Curtis 
| 1882-1883 
|
|
| 
|-
| John L. Wessells 
| 1883-1884 
|
|
| 
|-
| Daniel Nash Morgan 
| 1884-1885
|
|
| 
|-
| Henry H. Pyle
| 1885-1886 
| 
|
| 
|-
| Civilion Fones 
| 1886-1888
|
| A dentist, his son Alfred Fones was also a dentistand a leader in early oral hygiene and education.Alyssa Picard, Making the American Mouth: Dentists and Public Health in the Twentieth Century (Rutgers University Press, 2009), p. 36.
| 
|-
| Patrick Coughlin 
| 1888-1889
|
|
| 
|-
| Robert E. De Forest 
| 1889-1891
||Democratic
|
| 
|-
| William Henry Marigold 
| 1891-1893 
||Republican
|
| 
|-
| Walter B. Bostwick
| 1893-1895
|
|
| 
|-
| Frank E. Clark 
| 1895-1897
||Democratic
|
| 
|-
| Thomas P. Taylor 
| 1897-1899
||Republican
|
| 
|-
| Hugh Stirling 
| 1899-1901 
||Republican
|
| 
|-
| Denis Mulvihill
| 1901-1905
||Democratic
|
| Bridgeport Mayors 1901-Present, City of Bridgeport.
|-
| Marcus L. Reynolds 
| 1905-1907
|
|
| 
|-
| Henry Lee
| 1907-1909
|
|
| 
|-
| Edward T. Buckingham 
| 1909-1911
||Democratic
|
| 
|-
| Clifford B. Wilson 
| 1911-1921
||Republican
|
| 
|-
| Fred Atwater
| 1921-1923 
||Democratic
|
| 
|-
| F. William Behrens, Jr.
| 1923-1929 
||Republican
|
| 
|-
| Edward T. Buckingham 
| 1929-1933
||Democratic
|
| 
|-
| Jasper McLevy 
| 1933-1957
||Socialist
| Longest-serving mayor
| 
|-
| Samuel J. Tedesco
| 1957-1965
||Democratic
|
| 
|-
| Hugh C. Curran
| 1965-1971
||Democratic
|
| 
|-
| Nicholas A. Panuzio 
| 1971-1975
||Republican
| Resigned toward the end of his second term to serve as deputy administratorof the General Services Administration in the Gerald Ford administration
| 
|-
| William Seres
| 1975
||Republican
| President of the Common Council who succeeded as mayor followingPanuzio's resignation; served 55 days
| 
|-
| John C. Mandanici
| 1975-1981
||Democratic
|
| 
|-
| Leonard S. "Lenny" Paoletta
| 1981-1985
||Republican
|
| 
|-
| Thomas W. Bucci
| 1985-1989
||Democratic
|
| 
|-
| Mary C. Moran
| 1989-1991
||Republican
| First and only woman to serve as Bridgeport mayor; last Republican to serve as Bridgeport mayor; unsuccessfully sought to have city declared insolvent in municipal bankruptcyGeorge Judson, U.S. Judge Blocks Bridgeport From Bankruptcy Court, New York Times (August 2, 1991).
| 
|-
| Joseph P. "Joe" Ganim
| 1991-2003
||Democratic
| Second-longest serving Bridgeport mayor; was convicted onfederal corruption charges in 2003; spent seven years in prison.Edmund H. Mahony, Joe Ganim: Is He Back?, Hartford Courant, January 12, 2015.
| 
|-
| John M. Fabrizi
| 2003-2007
||Democratic
| Did not run for a second term in 2007 after admitting to a drinking problemand use of cocaine while in office.Brian Lockhart, Fabrizi exploring run for mayor, Connecticut Post, June 4, 2014.
| 
|-
| Bill Finch
| 2007-2015
||Democratic
| Defeated by Joseph P. Ganim during the Democratic primary in September 2015.
| 
|-
| Joseph P. "Joe" Ganim
| 2015-present
||Democratic
| Second-longest serving Bridgeport mayor; was convicted onfederal corruption charges in 2003; spent seven years in prison; re-elected to office November 3, 2015;Edmund H. Mahony, Joe Ganim: Is He Back?, Hartford Courant, January 12, 2015. Sworn in on December 1, 2015.
| 
|}

References
Specific

General
 Rob Sullivan, Political Corruption in Bridgeport: Scandal in the Park City (The History Press 2014)
 History of Bridgeport and Vicinity (Vol. 2), S.J. Clarke Publishing Co.: 1917, pp. 689-90.
 Men of Progress: Biographical Sketches and Portraits of Leaders in Business and Professional Life in and of the State of Connecticut] (ed. Richard Burton, 1898) p. 145.
 Commemorative Biographical Record of Fairfield County, Connecticut: Containing Biographical Sketches of Prominent and Representative Citizens, and of Many of the Early Settled Families (Higginson Book Co.: 1899).
 Charles Burr Todd, The History of Redding, Connecticut, from Its First Settlement to the Present Time'' (Grafton Press: 1906).

Government of Bridgeport, Connecticut
 
Bridgeport, Connecticut
History of Bridgeport, Connecticut